Andrzej Niewulis (born 21 April 1989) is a Polish professional footballer who plays as a centre-back for Miedź Legnica.

Career
In June 2010, he was loaned to Ruch Radzionków from Jagiellonia Białystok. He returned one year later. In July 2011, he was loaned to Wigry Suwałki from Jagiellonia Białystok.

Honours

Club
Jagiellonia Białystok
Polish Cup: 2009–10

Raków Częstochowa
Polish Cup: 2020–21, 2021–22
 Polish Super Cup: 2021

References

External links
 
 

1989 births
Living people
People from Suwałki
Polish footballers
Polish people of Lithuanian descent
Wigry Suwałki players
Widzew Łódź players
GKS Bełchatów players
Jagiellonia Białystok players
Ruch Radzionków players
OKS Stomil Olsztyn players
Znicz Pruszków players
Sportspeople from Podlaskie Voivodeship
Association football defenders
Raków Częstochowa players
Miedź Legnica players
Ekstraklasa players
I liga players
II liga players
III liga players